Connor Rozee (born 22 January 2000) is a professional Australian rules footballer who plays for the Port Adelaide Football Club in the Australian Football League (AFL). He was recruited by Port Adelaide with the 5th draft pick in the 2018 AFL Draft.

Early life
Rozee was born in Port Augusta, South Australia. He participated in the Auskick program at Port Augusta and played junior football with Spencer Gulf Football League (SGFL) club South Augusta. In 2016, he won the Kevin Sheehan Medal as the best player of the Under 16 AFL National Championship while also winning South Australia's Most Valuable Player award. Rozee played for South Australia in the AFL Under 18 Championships but was not pleased with his performance. He averaged 13 disposals across the carnival, showed some flashes and his state claimed the title, but it wasn't the standout period he was hoping for. After the championship, Port Adelaide AFL premiership player and North Adelaide Football Club coach Josh Carr gave Rozee his senior South Australian National Football League (SANFL) debut in 2018 and Rozee repaid his faith with an impressive campaign including a couple of vital performances in the Roosters’ successful finals series. Rozee went on to feature in the club's SANFL premiership win, with his improved form at the back end of the season against senior players showing why he is in the elite group of prospects at the top end of the draft. At the AFL Draft Combine, Rozee finished in the top 10 for the standing vertical jump and running vertical jump tests and agility test and was second overall in the 20m sprint (2.91 seconds). Port Adelaide selected Rozee at pick 5 in the 2018 AFL draft.

Rozee's father Robert Rozee  played for SANFL club South Adelaide and was a premiership player, club champion and club coach at South Augusta.

AFL career
Rozee made his AFL debut in Port Adelaide's upset win over Melbourne in the opening round of the 2019 AFL season. In Round 2, He kicked his first AFL goal and his second only minutes later in a win over Carlton. Rozee became the youngest Port Adelaide player to kick 5 goals in an AFL match. He also in 2019 went on to be Port Adelaide's youngest ever leading goalscorer and named into the AFL's 22under22 team.

After a promising first season, Rozee lacked a little bit of form to start the 2020 AFL season with shaping into a midfield role and over unfortunate events, the season was postponed due to the COVID-19 pandemic.

Statistics
Updated to the end of round 23, 2022.

|-
| 2019
|
| 20 || 22 || 29 || 22 || 168 || 168 || 336 || 76 || 88 || 1.3 || 1.0 || 7.6 || 7.6 || 15.3 || 3.5 || 4.0 || 4
|-
| 2020
|
| 20 || 16 || 9 || 9 || 106 || 100 || 206 || 40 || 52 || 0.6 || 0.6 || 6.6 || 6.3 || 12.9 || 2.5 || 3.3 || 0
|-
| 2021
|
| 20 || 21 || 21 || 13 || 176 || 159 || 335 || 71 || 60 || 1.0 || 0.6 || 8.4 || 7.6 || 16.0 || 3.4 || 2.9 || 1
|-
| 2022
|
| 20 || 22 || 18 || 14 || 248 || 262 || 510 || 89 || 84 || 0.8 || 0.6 || 11.3 || 11.9 || 23.2 || 4.0 || 3.8 || 
|- class="sortbottom"
! colspan=3| Career
! 81
! 77
! 58
! 698
! 689
! 1387
! 276
! 284
! 1.0
! 0.7
! 8.6
! 8.5
! 17.1
! 3.4
! 3.5
! 5
|}

Honours and achievements
Team
 McClelland Trophy: 2020
 SANFL premiership player (North Adelaide): 2018

Individual

  John Cahill Medal: 2022 All-Australian team: 2022
 Port Adelaide leading goalkicker: 2019
 2× 22under22 team: 2019, 2022
 Gavin Wanganeen Medal: 2019
 Peter Badcoe VC Medal: 2022
 Showdown Medal: 2022
 AFL Rising Star nominee''': 2019 (round 3)

References

External links

2000 births
Living people
Port Adelaide Football Club players
Australian rules footballers from South Australia